Adrian Trinidad (born 18 October 1982) is an Argentine football midfielder who plays for Persik Kediri in the Liga Indonesia.

Biography

Perth Glory
Trinidad played his first game for Perth Glory against the Newcastle Jets in which he scored his first and only goal for the club. Trinidad came under some criticism from opposition coaches after he was involved in the dismissal of Sydney FC's Iain Fyfe and for his alleged dive to win a penalty against Newcastle Jets (although replays showed that Trinidad was fouled). Trinidad was involved in an after match confrontation with Jets coach Gary van Egmond after the match which led to the FFA to investigate and ban van Egmond for two games.

References

External links
 Perth Glory profile

1982 births
Perth Glory FC players
A-League Men players
Argentine footballers
Argentine expatriate footballers
Expatriate footballers in Malaysia
Living people
Persiba Balikpapan players
Expatriate footballers in Indonesia
Expatriate soccer players in Australia
Association football midfielders
Footballers from Buenos Aires